

List of Useful Microorganisms Used In preparation Of Food And Beverage

See also
 Fermentation (food)
 Food microbiology

References

Brewing
Fermentation in food processing
Food science
Metabolism
Mycology
Oenology
Microorganisms used in food and beverage preparation
Microorganism